Everyday Process: The Process of Illumination & Elimination is the first solo album by Christian hip hop group Everyday Process. It was released by Cross Movement Records on 20 March 2007. The album was CMR's first release in 2007.

Track listing 
 "Intro (Straight To The Point)"
 "Build Up"
 "Resist The System"
 "Give 'Em The Gospel"
 "Grace"
 "All I Need" (ft. La'Tia & Keran)
 "Amazed"
 "Bangin' Defined" (Interlude)
 "Bangin'"
 "Holla At Me" (ft. Trip Lee)
 "Live It Up"
 "The After Party" (Interlude)
 "The After Party"
 "As Real As It Gets"
 "Hey Girl" (ft. Badia Jeter & J.R.)
 "The World Needs Jesus"
 "Shine Bright"
 "Illumination & Elimination" (Interlude)  
 "Everyday All Day Cypha" (ft. Lecrae, FLAME, R-Swift, The Ambassador & Phanatik)

2007 albums
Everyday Process albums